Federated Mission Networking (FMN) is a significant initiative to help ensure interoperability and operational effectiveness of the North Atlantic Treaty Organization, it is a key contribution to the Connected Forces Initiative, helping Allied and Partner forces to better communicate, train and operate together. This includes the NATO Command Structure as well as the NATO Force Structure. The purpose of FMN is ultimately to support Command, Control, Communications, Computers, Intelligence, Surveillance and Reconnaissance (C4ISR) and decision-making in operations by enabling a rapid instantiation of mission networks.
Including the NATO Command Structure, 37 nations have joined the FMN initiative as so called "FMN Affiliates" and work together under the FMN Framework Process to coordinate the design, development and delivery of operational and technical capabilities required to conduct net-centric operations. Each development increment is referred to as an "FMN Spiral". The respective requirements, architecture, standards, procedural and technical instructions are documented in so called "FMN Spiral Specifications". FMN Spiral Specifications are based on well known standards and best practices, hence supported by most off-the-shelf products and vendor neutral. TACOMS standards and profiles specify a common, technology and topology independent network interoperability layer (or federated core) for federated mission networks. There is also a rolling 10-year FMN Spiral Specification Roadmap of the envisioned future capabilities. At the same time, the Coalition Interoperability Assurance and Validation (CIAV) process ensures that current interoperability issues are being identified and fed back into FMN capability development.

Background
NATO Federated Mission Networking arose from the operational requirement in Afghanistan which necessitated troop contributing nations to operate in a single information sharing domain called the Afghanistan Mission Network (AMN). Through the experience of ISAF in Afghanistan, the value of a coalition-wide network was made clear: greater situational awareness facilitates more effective decision making. Based on improved coalition unity of effort and speed of command, Commander ISAF endorsed AMN best practices as the "right model" for future coalition missions and forwarded the requirement to NATO and to the US Chairman of the Joint Chiefs of Staff.
On 21 November 2012, the NATO Military Committee agreed the "Future Mission Network Concept", later noted by the North Atlantic Council (NAC), as the basis for the development of an implementation plan  that defines "the implications for NATO and the Nations". The Concept provided overarching guidance for establishing a federated mission networking capability that enables effective information sharing among NATO, NATO member nation and/or non-NATO entities participating in operations. The FMN Concept describes the operational requirements, principles, and implementation considerations for a capability consisting of three components: Governance, FMN Framework, and Mission Networks.

The FMN Concept envisions a world in which the commander of an operation effectively performs end-to-end processes and shares information in a coalition environment. This ability is enabled through a common understanding of how those processes are described and through the access to shared, secure information. The commander must be able to communicate intent and direction down to the tactical level and provide reports and recommendations up to the strategic level. Information must be available throughout the coalition force in any foreseeable operational scenario. Achievement of trust and transparency among mission participants is essential. The FMN Concept reflects a clear lesson learned: Operational experience has irrefutably demonstrated that a federated mission network is the best means to create this common, mission-wide data and information sharing environment. The FMN Concept concludes that the ability to generate federated mission network instances is therefore a key, essential capability for NATO, NATO member nations and/or non-NATO entities participating in operations.
In contrast to the AMN, Federated Mission Networking attempts for Mission Networks to be: 
 simpler, by reducing the number of joining options
 more robust, by removing the need for a centralized core and introducing redundant peering (TACOMS)
 faster to set-up, by providing off-the-shelf template solutions
 easier to manage, by using common and interoperable IT Service Management practices
 more flexible, by not having to depend on a single core
 able to share information with other entities, by introducing data labeling
 more cost effective, by enabling the cross provisioning of services between mission network participants
In the context of FMN, a federation is an association where each stakeholder retains control of their own capabilities and affairs while accepting and complying with the requirements laid out in pre-negotiated and agreed arrangements in a collective fashion.

To facilitate collaboration and coordination among "FMN Affiliates", NATO has agreed to host an FMN Secretariat which is composed of liaison officers from each "FMN Affiliate".  The FMN Secretariat coordinates the activities of five working groups which address operational and security requirements, capability planning and specification development, assurance and validation of interoperability, and coordination of change implementation. The working groups forward their products to a flag and general officer level FMN Management Group for review and delivery to respective national or organizational governance bodies for consideration, acceptance and implementation.

Command implications
The operational commander's requirements are the pre-eminent driver of each Mission Network. The FMN Concept identified six objectives that drive the operational requirements for nearly all mission networks:
 Seamless human-to-human communication across the force.
 A single view of the battle space across the Mission Network.
 Timely provision of a Mission Network.
 Provision of consistent, secure, accurate and reliable mission data.
 Community of Interest (COI) capabilities that align with the mission requirement.
 Well-trained staff that can support an effective decision cycle and take full advantage of the systems provided.
A Mission Network must support the respective chain of command and the execution of relevant mission threads and it must respond to the Commander's battle rhythm during each phase of the operation. FMN defines four different types of environments: 
 collective training environment (CTE) for preparing forces ahead of a mission
 verification and validation environment (VVE) for testing any changes to procedures, applications and services
 operations planning environment (OPE) for supporting collaborative planning of coalition participants that is conducted prior to deployment
 mission execution environment (MEE) covers the actual deployment and instantiation of a federated mission network to support a specific operation.

The NATO FMN Implementation Plan identified the need for establishing a mission thread approach to provide consistent context for interoperability, training, planning and mission activities to enhance the effectiveness of future operations and inform FMN implementation. As a result, the NATO Strategic Commands produced a NATO Mission Thread Capstone Concept. The implementation of this concept will impact the development of the Doctrine, Organization, Training and Standards, and requires contributions and participation of the operational community.

Industry implications
In support of the FMN initiative, the Network Centric Operations Industry Consortium has introduced a new Interoperability Verification (IV) process, intended to support the acquisition of technical products and services for Federated Mission Networking. The IV assessment, based on product testing that takes place as part of the normal quality manufacturing process, looks at how well the technology meets FMN Spiral Specifications and can be implemented. The vision is for NATO and its partners to get enhanced capability for the same cost and for vendors to have access to more markets.

National implementation
Following the idea of a federation, each FMN affiliate is responsible for implementing own capabilities that conform with FMN Spiral Specifications.

  Based on the lessons learned from operations in many coalitions, Belgium decided to formally affiliate to FMN early in March 2016. The implementation of this international initiative is drawn up by using a pragmatic and holistic approach following the DOTMLPFI methodology. At this stage (Spiral 2 as of June 2019), Belgium disposes of a capability enabler (Mission Defence Network) which offers minimum services to allow deployed troops to communicate, share and exchange information with partners, in a secure way, and automatically. Those services will be expanding with the following spiral development.

  Canada's C4ISR Vision  outlines the importance of interoperability with its Joint, Interagency, Multinational, Public (JIMP) partners and sets strategic objectives to achieve it within both the enduring and episodic domains of its Military Integrated Information Infrastructure (MI3). Recognizing that FMN concepts and standards are key to achieving its goals, Canada is implementing the FMN Spiral specifications as part of its 'Canadian Deployable Mission Network' (CDMN) design. True operational interoperability takes more than just technology so Canada champions the use of FMN capable forces in all appropriate multilateral operations, exercises and events that it participates in as a way to ingrain interoperability as a fundamental aspect of modern operations.

 Established in May 2020, the FMN 'French Roadmap for the Interoperability of Systems' in a multinational Environment (FRISE) is the national FMN implementation programme within the French Ministry of Armed Forces. 
The main stakeholders from the Defence Staff (État-Major des Armées, EMA) and the Defence Procurement Directorate (Direction générale de l’armement, DGA) aim to align various national capability development activities with the FMN Initiative and contribute to its battle-rhythm.

  The initiative 'German Mission Network' aims to create improved command and control capabilities for the German armed forces. The German Mission Network is fully compatible with NATO's Federated Mission Networking and merges the previously physically separated IT systems and services, for deployments to a physically and logically interoperable and integrated multinational system-of-systems.  The 'Harmonization of Command and Control Information Systems' program (Harmonisierung der Führungsinformationssysteme - HaFIS) is the first to spearhead this challenge with a planned successive enlargement to other projects over the following years.

  In 2015, after the formal affiliation to the FMN initiative, Italy approved the Governance and Management structure of the Italian FMN initiative aiming at achieving the capability to set up and manage a Mission Network according to the FMN Specifications. In 2016 Italy confirmed the compliance of the Italian FMN Node to FMN Spiral 1 requirements in a number of multinational exercises and has actively contributed to the development for the next set of capabilities. In the light of the results achieved in 2016, Italy decided to implement the capability acquired in Afghanistan by deploying an FMN Node federated to the Afghanistan Mission Network (AMN) which is now fully operational. 
The Italian Defence is also in the process of approving the implementation  of an Italian Mission Network to fulfil the needs in terms of Command and Control of  a mission or multinational operations (also in the role of "leading nation" of a coalition) or,  in a dual use perspective, in case of an emergency operation for humanitarian aid and disaster relief.
Italy is also fully engaged in the FMN management with Subject Matter Experts and representatives in the FMN Secretariat, contributing to the evolution of the NATO FMN initiative.

  The Netherlands implemented the first set of agreed FMN capabilities (Spiral 1) within their deployable Theatre Independent Tactical Adaptive Armed Forces Network (TITAAN) which is used by the Dutch armed forces. The next steps include further alignment with FMN capabilities and the implementation of future FMN Spiral Specifications within TITAAN. The Netherlands acknowledged that the implementation of federated capabilities needs a DOTMLPF-I perspective to be able to reach the next level of interoperability.
The German and Dutch armed forces are taking their cooperation to an unprecedented level of integration. It entails the harmonization of requirements, procedures, education and training. Federating capabilities provided by both nations in the context of the multinational 1 (GE/NL) Corps is a demonstration of the practical implementation of FMN and helps nations to gain experience and to enhance flexibility and interoperability.

  In recognizing that FMN is more than just creating interoperable C2 systems, like the Netherlands, Norway is seeking to adopt the entire concept of Federation and Networking from a DOTMLPF-I perspective. In practical terms this involves other agencies than those traditionally involved with development and implementation of C2 systems. In particular, the engagement of  decision makers at Ministry of Defence level and operational planning staff at the highest level of operational command is considered to be essential. Regarding implementation of the FMN technical aspects, Norway has chosen not to create a dedicated implementation programme. Instead, FMN Spiral Specifications will be injected into upgrades of existing systems and emerging projects.

  Poland is implementing a Polish Mission Network (PMN) in accordance with FMN Spiral Specifications. It consists of a permanent Polish Mission Network Element to which units can connect their network extensions during national and multinational exercises. For the first time PMN was successfully implemented during Exercise Anakonda 2016 as the main part of a federation based on five Mission Network Elements.  PMN instantiation is also being used by NATO's enhanced Forward Presence (eFP) as the capability ready for interoperability with NATO's NRF and VJTF.

 In 2016, Sweden announced its intention to become an FMN Affiliate with the level of ambition as a Mission Network Extension participant. FMN constitutes an important basis for interoperability and the Swedish Armed Forces have stated that by 2023, Command and Control information system such as SWECCIS must be fully FMN compatible. Sweden recognize that future FMN spiral specifications will include additional requirements for evolving the Armed Forces' operational command support system to continue to be FMN compatible.

  The United Kingdom has built upon its experiences in Afghanistan to develop mission configurable capabilities as described in Strategic Defence and Security Review 2015.  This work aligns to FMN with the MAGPIE system utilizing FMN Spiral 1 Specification which is already in service with HQ ARRC.  The New Style of IT (NSoIT) programme has subsumed the work initiated by the Information Superiority in Contingent Operations (ISCO) research programme and JACKDAW equipment programme to develop a configurable system that will meet the Spiral 2 specification and be readily updateable to future FMN spirals. Whilst MAGPIE is predominantly a land system, NSoIT will be deployed across the whole of the British Armed Forces.

  The United States implementation program is known under the name of 'Mission Partner Environment' (MPE)  and it reflects US DoD desire to be an FMN affiliate. 
From the technical perspective, the US DoD CIO's office has been working on the Mission Partner Environment Information System (MPE-IS), which provides the ability to change things quickly so that networks can be: set up quickly to support the joint force; broken down very quickly; and federated to exchange information in support of the joint force, the DoD and mission partners.
MPE-IS aligns with NATO's FMN capability, enhancing the mission and ability to work with mission partners.
For continuity of historical references, it is useful to know that both FMN and the US MPE efforts started out under the moniker 'Future Mission Network' but underwent name changes in 2012 to avoid inevitable confusion due to association with something that was 'always in the future' or limited to materiel oriented IT and network solutions.

References

External links 
NATO’s capabilities by Headquarters NATO, www.nato.int
Federated Mission Networking by Headquarters SACT, www.act.nato.int
Federated Mission Networking Implementation Seminar by Headquarters SACT, www.act.nato.int
 
 

 
 
 TACOMS EA Model by Front End AB

NATO standardisation